Nicholas Briggs (born 29 September 1961) is an English actor, writer, director, sound designer and composer. He is associated with the BBC science fiction television series Doctor Who and its spin-offs, particularly as the voice of the Daleks and the Cybermen in the 21st century series.

He is also the executive producer of Big Finish Productions, for which he has produced, directed and written several audio plays, as well as acting in many of them.

Education
Briggs went to Rose Bruford College with Barry Killerby, who is better known as Mr Blobby.

Career

Doctor Who
Some of Briggs' earliest Doctor Who-related work was as host of The Myth Makers, a series of made-for-video documentaries produced in the 1980s and 1990s by Reeltime Pictures in which Briggs interviews many of the actors, writers and directors involved in the series. When Reeltime expanded into producing original dramas, Briggs wrote some stories and acted in others, beginning with Wartime, the first unofficial Doctor Who spin-off, and Myth Runner, a parody of Blade Runner showcasing bloopers from the Myth Makers series built around a loose storyline featuring Briggs as a down on his luck private detective in the near future.

In the late 1980s, Briggs also provided the voice of a future incarnation of the Doctor for a series of unofficial audio dramas by Audio Visuals (a forerunner of Big Finish Productions). This version of the Doctor also appeared in "Party Animals", an instalment of the Doctor Who comic published in Doctor Who Magazine issue 173, cover date 15 May 1991. Briggs also provided the model for the face of the supposed "Ninth Doctor" for Doctor Who Magazine in the late 1990s, when the magazine's comic strip ran a storyline in which the Eighth Doctor apparently regenerated, only for it to later be revealed that the whole thing had been a massive deception (see Shayde and Fey Truscott-Sade).

He wrote and appeared in several made-for-video dramas by BBV, including the third of the Stranger stories, In Memory Alone opposite former Doctor Who stars Colin Baker and Nicola Bryant. (In Memory Alone would be the last of the Stranger series to have any similarity to Doctor Who, which had inspired it.) He also wrote and appeared in a non-Stranger BBV production called The Airzone Solution (1993) and directed a documentary film, Stranger than Fiction (1994).

Briggs co-wrote a Doctor Who book called The Dalek Survival Guide (published by BBC Books 2002).

He also voiced the Cyber-Controller and Professor Osborn in the 2002 webcast audio series Real Time.

Since Doctor Who returned to television in 2005, Briggs has provided the voices for several monsters, most notably the Daleks and the Cybermen. Briggs also voiced the Nestene Consciousness in the 2005 episode "Rose", and recorded a voice for the Jagrafess in the 2005 episode "The Long Game". He also provided the voices for the Judoon in both the 2007 and 2008 series as well as the spin-off series The Sarah Jane Adventures, and did the voice of the Ice Warrior Skaldak in the 2013 episode "Cold War".

On 9 July 2009, Briggs made his first appearance in the Doctor Who spin-off Torchwood in the serial Children of Earth, playing Special Government Advisor Rick Yates.

Briggs has directed many of the Big Finish Productions audio plays, and has provided Dalek, Cybermen, and other alien voices in several of those as well. He has also written and directed the Dalek Empire and Cyberman audio plays for Big Finish. In 2006, Briggs took over from Gary Russell (who had been producer of Big Finish since 1999) and became co-executive producer of the company. In 2007, he guest starred in the Sapphire and Steel audio drama Water Like a Stone.

Briggs voiced the Daleks in a charity theatre production of The Daleks' Master Plan and briefly appeared on stage playing a regenerated Doctor. Briggs also recorded a short cameo, as the Daleks for the live Dr Who podcast stage show, 50 Years of Doctor Who: Preachrs Podcast Live 2. He appeared in this alongside a mix of modern and classic Doctor Who actors including; Peter Davison, Richard Franklin, Simon Fisher Becker and Terry Molloy.

In 2010 he starred in Doctor Who Live as Winston Churchill.

In 2012, his Doctor Who novel The Dalek Generation was published by Random House/BBC Books.

In 2013 Briggs portrayed the Dalek voice actor Peter Hawkins in the BBC docudrama An Adventure in Space and Time, which depicted the inception of Doctor Who. In November 2013 he also appeared in the one-off 50th anniversary comedy homage The Five(ish) Doctors Reboot.

Other
Briggs also directed, created the sound design and composed the incidental music for all three series of the BBC Radio 4 science fiction comedy Nebulous, written by Graham Duff and starring Mark Gatiss.

Outside the realm of science fiction, Briggs has appeared on stage at Nottingham's Theatre Royal since 1997, including a run as Sherlock Holmes in Holmes and the Ripper by Brian Clemens and The House of the Baskervilles, adapted by Briggs himself.

Briggs has also been playing Sherlock Holmes in an acclaimed series of audio dramas for Big Finish Productions since 2011. Productions include dramatised adaptations of Conan Doyle stories such as The Hound of the Baskervilles, "The Final Problem" and "The Empty House", as well as original stories such as The Adventure of the Perfidious Mariner, The Ordeals of Sherlock Holmes and The Judgement of Sherlock Holmes. Richard Earl co-stars as Dr. Watson.

He also appeared in the films Adulthood and 4.3.2.1, both written and directed by fellow Doctor Who actor Noel Clarke. Briggs became the presenter of Radio 7's Seventh Dimension, daily science fiction segment in 2011. As of 15 April 2013, he is part of a rotating line-up of hosts of the 7th Dimension on BBC Radio 4 Extra.

Briggs hosts the Big Finish podcast, a promotional podcast for Big Finish Productions and The Benji and Nick show, a podcast that where he and fellow Big Finish sound designer Benji Clifford discuss old cult television shows with regular guest appearances from Shelley Dean and Jamie Anderson.

Filmography

Film

Television

Video games

Bibliography
 Doctor Who (in Doctor Who Magazine #218–220, 1994)
 The Dalek Survival Guide (published by BBC Books 2002)

References

External links

 Official website
 

1961 births
Alumni of Rose Bruford College
English male film actors
English male radio actors
English male stage actors
English male television actors
English male video game actors
English male voice actors
English radio writers
Living people
Male actors from Hampshire
People from Lyndhurst, Hampshire